Anita Kalinde is the MP for Thyolo North in Malawi.

Kalinde–Sangala parliament tussle
Kalinde received much media attention when she was involved in a physical attack in parliament with the former Minister of Home Affairs & National Defense, Aaron Sangala in 2011. During a session in parliament on the Robert Chasowa murder case, Kalinde had requested that the Minister of Home Affairs and Internal Security clarify some issues. In his response, Sangala implied that atrocities involving the removal of body parts was common in the previous UDF regime, he noted that Kalinde herself and her deceased husband, Marshall Mdukulira Mbwatalika nicknamed 'The Duke', had been involved in a case where body part had been removed and traded. Kalinde accused Sangala of using delay tactics and diverging from the topic in order to avoid answering the questions. Kalinde requested that Sangala withdraw his statement. Sangala did not withdraw his statement. When the Speaker of Parliament Henry Chimunthu Banda adjourned the proceedings for tea break, she quickly proceeded towards Sangala, grabbed him by the neck. Sangala's shirt was ripped in the process. Some accused Sangala of ripping his own shirt in order to exaggerate the extent of the grab. After a review of the incident, including video footage of the attack, she was suspended for thirty days for the attack. Video material of the attack went viral in Malawi and abroad.

References

Members of the National Assembly (Malawi)
Living people
Malawian women in politics
Year of birth missing (living people)